The Hariksee is a lake in the Niederrhein ("Lower Rhine" region in North Rhine-Westphalia, Germany. It has a surface area of 0.2 km². The River Schwalm flows through the lake.

Lakes of North Rhine-Westphalia